Diamond Glacier is a glacier in the Garibaldi Ranges of the Pacific Ranges in southwestern British Columbia, Canada. It lies on the Mount Garibaldi massif between Atwell Peak and Diamond Head.

References

Glaciers of the Pacific Ranges
Garibaldi Ranges